Regina: Un Musical Para Una Nación Que Despierta (Regina: A musical for an awaking nation) is a musical presented in the San Rafael Theater in Mexico. The musical part of the play was composed by Antonio Calvo, with lyrics by Alex Slucki, based on the novel Regina (1987) by Antonio Velasco Piña. This play was performed for the first time on March 21, 2003.

History 
This is the very first time Lucero performed in a play. She accepted the role that was offered by Pablo Perroni, Antonio Calvo and Renato Herrera. Lucero looked the opportunity because she rejected the role of the soap opera Amor real by the director Carla Estrada.

Synopsis 
Regina was born from the union of Popocatépetl and Iztaccíhuatl volcanoes in the 50s. She was a dakini with supernatural powers inherited by the Dalai Lama, dominated the nature (the rain, the wind, the day, the night, etc.). This was discovered by Tagdra Rimpoche, her mentor, along with the Dalai Lama, upon doing some tests with objects, where she, in a natural way, would choose the same objects that the Dalai Lama had already chosen .

Musical Numbers 
 Ciudad Inhumana 
 Digan Por qué 
 Hechizo de Luna 
 Lama La 
 Luz de mi verdad 
 Viva Regina 
 La Cárcel China 
 Gloria 
 No hay tiempo que perder 
 Libres 
 Amanecer 
 Con un solo pensamiento 
 Dinos por qué 
 Mira con los ojos de la esencia

Performers 
 Lucero
 Edgar Cañas
 Ana Regina Cuarón
 Jano
 Enrique del Olmo
 Danna Paola
 José Roberto Pisano
 Moisés Suárez
 Alejandro Villeli

See also
 Regina (album)

References

 http://www.castalbums.org/recordings/6800

1997 musicals
Musicals based on novels